Houten is a railway station located in Houten, Netherlands. The station was opened on 1 November 1868 and is located on the Utrecht–Boxtel railway and the Houten - Houten Castellum tram line which closed on 14 December 2008. The services are operated by Nederlandse Spoorwegen. The station was closed between 1935 and 1982.

A 2005 ProRail survey estimated there were about 9,224 passengers using this station per day.

Original Station

The original station was the one opened in 1868, which closed in 1935.

Moving the Station

The building had to be moved to allow for the line to be quad-tracked from Utrecht to 's-Hertogenbosch, but the station building was part of Houten's past and it is the last building of its type on this line.

Train services

Bus services

Gallery

External links
NS website 
Dutch Public Transport journey planner 

Railway stations in Utrecht (province)
Railway stations on the Staatslijn H
Railway stations opened in 1868
Railway stations closed in 1935
Railway stations opened in 1982
1868 establishments in the Netherlands
Houten
Railway stations in the Netherlands opened in the 19th century